David Bevan is an English mathematician, computer scientist and software developer. 
He is known for Bevan's theorem, which gives the asymptotic enumeration of grid classes of permutations and for his work on enumerating the class of permutations avoiding the pattern 1324.
He is also known for devising weighted reference counting, an approach to computer memory management that is suitable for use in distributed systems.

Work and research
Bevan is a lecturer in combinatorics in the department of Mathematics and Statistics at the University of Strathclyde.
He has degrees in mathematics and computer science from the University of Oxford and a degree in theology from the London School of Theology. He received his PhD in mathematics from The Open University in 2015; his thesis, On the growth of permutation classes, was supervised by Robert Brignall.

In 1987, as a research scientist at GEC's Hirst Research Centre in Wembley, he developed an approach to computer memory management, called weighted reference counting, that is suitable for use in distributed systems.
During the 1990s, while working for the Summer Institute of Linguistics in Papua New Guinea, he developed a computer program, called FindPhone, that was widely used by field linguists to analyse phonetic data in order to understand the phonology of minority languages.
While employed by Pitney Bowes, he was a major contributor to the development of the FreeType text rendering library.

Bevan's mathematical research has concerned areas of enumerative combinatorics, particularly in relation to permutation classes. 
He established that the growth rate of a monotone grid class of permutations is equal to the square of the spectral radius of a related bipartite graph.
He has also determined bounds on the growth rate of
the class of permutations avoiding the pattern 1324.
In the Acknowledgements sections of his journal articles, he often includes the Latin phrase
Soli Deo gloria.

Selected publications

References

External links
 David Bevan's page at the University of Strathclyde

Combinatorialists
21st-century English mathematicians
English mathematicians
English computer scientists
Academics of the University of Strathclyde
Alumni of The Queen's College, Oxford
Alumni of the London School of Theology
Alumni of the Open University
1961 births
Living people